The Torsus Praetorian is a 4x4 off-road bus. The bus is manufactured by Torsus, a Czech company, set up by Ukrainians Vakhtang Dzukashvili and Yulia Khomich as a subsidiary of their Pulsar Expo company. It can seat up to 35 people, has  of ground clearance, and has a  six-cylinder diesel engine. The off-road bus is suited to specific industries such as oil and gas, forestry, mining, disaster and emergency response, expeditions, safaris, and ski resorts.

In 2020 the firm introduced a smaller minibus called the Torsus Terrastorm, which is based on a Volkswagen Crafter 4Motion chassis.

References 

Buses